Italy is considered to be part of the wine belt of Europe. Nevertheless, beer, particularly mass-produced pale lagers, are common in the country. It is traditionally considered to be an ideal accompaniment to pizza; since the 1970s, beer has spread from pizzerias and has become much more popular for drinking in other situations.

In the seventh century BC in Sicily, the Phoenicians traded and consumed beer. In Piedmont, Pombia, Province of Novara, an archaeological investigation found tombs from the Golasecca culture, including a tomb from 560 BC containing traces of beer. Ancient Rome knew of beer and produced small amounts, but the systems of production were destroyed in various barbarian invasions. The first medical school, the Schola Medica Salernitana, praised the substance stating that it "supports old age, flows through the veins, increases well-being, and strengthens the blood."

On the occasion of his wedding, Ludovico Sforza distributed beer freely to the Milanese. At this time, it was referred to in Florence as "barley wine". The first brewery in Italy, according to Hermes Zampollo, was "Spluga" in Chiavenna, which opened in 1840. However, the company Wührer stated that its brewing commenced in Brescia in 1829. In 1983, the country consumed  of beer.

Breweries and brands

One of the oldest and most widespread breweries in Italy is Peroni, today owned by the Asahi group, which also owns the popular brand Nastro Azzurro. Other known breweries and beer brands are:
 Beba
 Birra del Borgo (owned by InBev)
 Birra Raffo (owned by Asahi)
 Birrificio Baladin
 Birrificio Italiano
 Castello
 Dreher (owned by Heineken)
 Forst
 Ichnusa (owned by Heineken)
 Menabrea (owned by Forst)
 Birrificio Dr. Barbanera
 Birra Messina (owned by Heineken)
 Birrificio Lambrate
 Birra Morena
 Moretti (owned by Heineken)
 Opperbacco
 Birra Pedavena (owned by Castello)
 Peroni (owned by Asahi)
 Poretti (owned by Carlsberg)
 Birra Semedorato
 Toccalmatto
 Theresianer

See also

 Beer and breweries by region

References

Bibliography

External links